The 1908 United States presidential election in South Carolina took place on November 3, 1908. Voters chose 9 representatives, or electors to the Electoral College, who voted for president and vice president.

South Carolina overwhelmingly voted for the Democratic nominee, former U.S. Representative William Jennings Bryan, over the Republican nominee, Secretary of War William Howard Taft. Bryan won the state by a landslide margin of 87.9%, even carrying Hampton County unanimously 
Although South Carolina was Taft's weakest state, he performed slightly better in the state than Theodore Roosevelt had four years prior.

Results

Results by county

References

South Carolina
1908
1908 South Carolina elections